Francis William Speer (March 20, 1942 – February 12, 1989) was a Canadian professional ice hockey player. He played in the National Hockey League and World Hockey Association between 1967 and 1974. He won the Stanley Cup with the Boston Bruins in 1970.

Career
Speer played 135 games in the World Hockey Association and 130 games in the National Hockey League. Born in Lindsay, Ontario, he played for the Boston Bruins, Pittsburgh Penguins, New York Raiders, New York Golden Blades, and Jersey Knights. Speer was known as a solid, shot-blocking defenseman throughout his career.

Speer was known for his weight issues during his hockey career. Although generally listed as 5' 11" and 200 pounds throughout his career, his regularly played closer to 210 pounds and even weighed as much as 242 pounds during the 1966-67 offseason. Speer was able to lose most of the weight, dropping down to 210 for the opening of Penguins' training camp and even dropping as low as 206.

During his time with the Pittsburgh Penguins, he was also the designated team barber, setting up a makeshift barbershop in the wash room of the Penguins' dressing room in the Civic Arena. Speer became a barber at the age of 15 and took over his father's shop in 1967 after his father died. Although he never mentioned a specific fee for the haircuts, Speer did say that a 25 cent tip was standard. Speer earned the nickname "The Lindsay Clipper" during his time with the Bruins. After his playing days were over, some of his former teammates would visit the shop from time to time.

Speer won the Stanley Cup with the Boston Bruins in 1970, scoring one goal that season. It occurred on February 11, 1970, in Boston's 3–2 victory at St. Louis. It was the last NHL goal of Speer's career.

Death
Speer died on February 12, 1989, while riding his snowmobile on a lake in Fenelon Falls, Ontario. The snowmobile plunged through the thin ice and Speer drowned. He was 46 years old.

Speer is buried in Riverside Cemetery in Lindsay, Ontario.

Career statistics

Regular season and playoffs

References

External links
 
 

1942 births
1989 deaths
Amarillo Wranglers players
Baltimore Clippers players
Boston Bruins players
Canadian ice hockey defencemen
Cleveland Barons (1937–1973) players
Ice hockey people from Ontario
Jersey Knights players
Knoxville Knights players
New York Golden Blades players
New York Raiders players
Ontario Hockey Association Senior A League (1890–1979) players
Pittsburgh Penguins players
Salt Lake Golden Eagles (WHL) players
Sault Thunderbirds players
St. Catharines Teepees players
Stanley Cup champions
Sportspeople from Kawartha Lakes